The name Cristina has been used for seven tropical cyclones in the Eastern Pacific Ocean.
 Hurricane Cristina (1984), did not affect any land
 Tropical Storm Cristina (1990), did not make landfall
 Tropical Storm Cristina (1996), made landfall near Puerto Ángel; claimed 13 lives and left 62 missing; 11 fishing boats were reported missing and 350 people were left homeless
 Tropical Storm Cristina (2002), never threatened land; no impact reported
 Tropical Storm Cristina (2008), did not make landfall
 Hurricane Cristina (2014), peaked at Category 4 intensity
 Tropical Storm Cristina (2020), never threatened land

Pacific hurricane set index articles